Panariello is an Italian surname. Notable people with the surname include:

Aniello Panariello (born 1988), Italian footballer
Giorgio Panariello (born 1960), Italian comedian, actor, director, and television presenter

Italian-language surnames